Jean-François Le Sueur (more commonly Lesueur) (15 February 17606 October 1837) was a French composer, best known for his oratorios and operas.

Life
He was born at Plessiel, a hamlet of Drucat near Abbeville, to a long-established family of Picardy, the great-nephew of the painter Eustache Le Sueur. Beginning as a chorister at the collegial church of Abbeville, then at the cathedral of Amiens, where he pursued his music studies, Le Sueur was named chorus master at the cathedral of Sées. He went to Paris to study harmony with the Abbé Nicolas Roze, chorus master at the Saints-Innocents. Le Sueur was named to positions at Dijon (1779), Le Mans (1782), then at Tours (1783) before he succeeded Roze at the Saints-Innocents at Paris. Finally, in 1786, after a competition, he was made music director at Notre-Dame de Paris.

For the Feast of the Assumption, he innovated by introducing an orchestra, with great success, and his sacred concerts at the main feasts of the Church filled the cathedral to overflowing but incurred resistance in ecclesiastical circles.  He replied by publishing a pamphlet Exposé d'une musique imitative et particulière à chaque solennité (1787). The cathedral chapter decided to reduce its musical budget in a time of financial crisis for France, which constrained Le Sueur to give up the important musical Masses that he specialised in, and to give up his position. 

He spent some time in London, 1788–92, then returned to revolutionary Paris and gave three successful operas at the Théâtre Feydeau: La Caverne, ou le Repentir (1793), Paul et Virginie, ou le Triomphe de la vertu (1794), which was inspired by the hugely popular novel by Jacques-Henri Bernardin de Saint-Pierre, and the classical Télémaque dans l'île de Calypso, ou le Triomphe de la sagesse (1796).

He was named professor at the École de la Garde Nationale, 21 November, 1793, then named Inspecteur at the newly founded Conservatoire. In the company of Étienne Nicolas Méhul, Honoré Langlé, François-Joseph Gossec and Charles Simon Catel, he was limited to teaching elementary principles and solfège. Unable to get his operas Ossian, ou Les bardes and La mort d'Adam mounted at the Paris Opéra, Le Sueur published a violent pamphlet, Projet d'un plan général de l'instruction musicale en France, attacking the Conservatoire, its methods and its director, and was discharged, 23 September 1802.

Without official appointments, Le Sueur was reduced to poverty when in 1804, Napoleon named him maître de la chapelle at the Tuileries, to replace Giovanni Paisiello. Now he was able to mount his most famous work, Ossian ou Les bardes, with great success at the Opéra and with the Emperor, who made the composer of his favorite opera a Chevalier de la Légion d'honneur. Le Sueur composed the Triumphal March for the coronation of Napoleon, directed a Mass by Paisiello and a Vivat by his former master abbé Roze. In 1813, he was named to the Académie des Beaux-Arts, replacing André Grétry.

At the Restoration, he was named composer of the royal chapel and conductor of the orchestra of the Opéra. From the beginning of 1818, he taught composition at the Conservatoire, where over the years he had for pupils Hector Berlioz, Ambroise Thomas, Charles Gounod, Louis Désiré Besozzi and Antoine François Marmontel.

He died on 6 October 1837 in Paris.

Works

Oratorios
Ruth et Noëmi (written by 1811)
Ruth et Booz  (written by 1811)
Debbora
Rachel
Oratorio de Noël (Christmas Oratorio)
Three Passion oratorios
Coronation oratorios

Operas

References

Attribution

Sources
Howard E. Smither A History of the Oratorio, Volume 3: The Oratorio in the Classical Era (University of North Carolina Press, 1977)
Raoul Rochette., Les Ouvrages de M. Lesueur (Paris. 1839).

External links
 

1760 births
1837 deaths
People from Somme (department)
French male classical composers
18th-century French people
18th-century French composers
18th-century classical composers
French opera composers
Male opera composers
Academic staff of the Conservatoire de Paris
Directors of the Conservatoire de Paris
Honorary Members of the Royal Philharmonic Society
Burials at Père Lachaise Cemetery
Chevaliers of the Légion d'honneur